Camille Maurane (November 29, 1911 – January 21, 2010), born Camille Moreau, was a French baryton-martin singer. His father was a music teacher and he started singing as a child in the Maîtrise Saint-Evode in Rouen. The sudden death of his mother and family upheaval meant a break of twelve years in regular singing.

He studied at the Paris Conservatoire in the class of Claire Croiza from 1936 to 1939. He began his professional career as a singer in 1940 at the Opéra-Comique in Paris. After his debut as the Moine musicien in Le Jongleur de Notre-Dame on 14 January 1940, he went to create the following roles at the Opéra-Comique:
the captain (Nèle Dooryn, 1940)
Doria (Ginevra, 1942)
a man, a peasant (Mon Oncle Benjamin, 1942)
a young man (Le Oui des Jeunes Filles, 1949).
Un Soldat (Dolorès, 1952)
He also sang in The Barber of Seville, La Basoche, Carmen, Lakmé, Louise, Madame Bovary, Madame Butterfly, Werther, Pelléas et Mélisande and oratorios like La Chanson du mal-aimé. He was occasionally billed under the name Moreau.

His voice was typical of the baryton-martin range (between baritone and tenor). He is famous for his interpretation of Debussy's Pelléas, for which he took part in three complete recordings of Pelléas et Mélisande. He is also regarded as one of the best interpreters of French mélodies, of which he left many recordings, since reissued on CD, and of Fauré's Requiem. His repertoire extended back to music of Rameau through to Arthur Honegger, Léo Ferré and other contemporaries.

A dedicated teacher, he taught at the Paris Conservatory until 1981.

References

External links 
Camille Maurane, baryton français (Wikipedia France, with discography)

1911 births
2010 deaths
Musicians from Rouen
Conservatoire de Paris alumni
20th-century French male singers
French operatic baritones